Dixon Jair Arroyo Espinoza (born 1 June 1992) is an Ecuadorian footballer who plays for Emelec.

International career
He made his debut for Ecuador national football team on 29 March 2021 in a friendly against Bolivia.

References

External links
 
 

1992 births
Sportspeople from Guayaquil
Living people
Ecuadorian footballers
Ecuador under-20 international footballers
Ecuador international footballers
Association football midfielders
S.D. Quito footballers
L.D.U. Loja footballers
C.S.D. Independiente del Valle footballers
C.S. Emelec footballers
Ecuadorian Serie A players
2021 Copa América players
C.S. Norte América footballers